The Diocese of Helsinki is a diocese of the Evangelical Lutheran Church of Finland, and the seat of the Bishop of Helsinki. Its cathedral is Helsinki Cathedral.

The diocese was established in 1959 by dividing the Diocese of Tampere. It covers only 1% of the country's territory, but contains 10% of its population. The diocese comprises 39 parishes. It was partitioned again in 2002, when the western part became the Diocese of Espoo. The current bishop of Helsinki is Teemu Laajasalo.

The diocese is unique among the Finnish dioceses in the sense that in some parish areas, the church members are in a minority. In the Kallio and Vallila districts, church membership among the residents is circa 49 per cent. Only in six of the 18 parishes of the diocese the membership share reaches over 60 per cent of the population.

Bishops of Helsinki 

Martti Simojoki 1959–1964
Aarre Lauha 1964–1972
Aimo T. Nikolainen 1972–1982
Samuel Lehtonen 1982–1991
Eero Huovinen 1991–2010
Irja Askola 2010–2017
Teemu Laajasalo 2017–

References

External links 
 

Lutheran districts established in the 20th century
Organisations based in Helsinki
Lutheranism in Finland
Christian organizations established in 1959
Christianity in Helsinki